Eupeodes punctifer is a species of hoverflies belonging to the family Syrphidae.

It is native to Northern Europe.

References

Syrphini